The 1982 Benson and Hedges Open was a men's professional tennis tournament held in Auckland, New Zealand. The event was part of the 1982 Grand Prix circuit. It was the 15th edition of the tournament and was played on outdoor hardcourts and was held from 11 January through 17 January 1982. Second-seeded Tim Wilkison won the singles title.

Finals

Singles

 Tim Wilkison defeated  Russell Simpson 6–4, 6–4, 6–4
 It was Wilkison's only title of the year and the 7th of his career.

Doubles
 Andrew Jarrett /  Jonathan Smith defeated  Larry Stefanki /  Robert Van't Hof 7–5, 7–6
 It was Jarrett's only title of the year and the 1st of his career. It was Smith's 1st title of the year and the 1st of his career.

References

External links
 ATP – tournament profile
 ITF – tournament editions details

Heineken Open
ATP Auckland Open
1982 Grand Prix (tennis)
January 1982 sports events in New Zealand